John Lindsay Ritchie (1875 – 1943) was a Scottish footballer who played as a full back for Renton, Queen's Park, Hibernian and St Mirren.

He started his senior career with Renton, playing in the 1895 Scottish Cup Final which ended in a 2–1 defeat to St Bernard's; he joined Queen's Park (who were not members of the Scottish Football League at the time) in 1896, and won the Glasgow Football League in 1896–97. After short spells with Hibs and St Mirren he returned to Renton (by now no longer SFL members), and was in the side that performed strongly in the 1906–07 Scottish Cup – alongside his younger cousin Duncan Ritchie whose career was just beginning – beating St Bernard's then Dundee before going out to Queen's Park in the quarter-finals.

Ritchie played once for the Scotland national football team, in a British Home Championship match against Wales in March 1897. Ritchie captained the Scotland team and scored a goal from a penalty kick in the match, which ended in a 2–2 draw. At the end of that year he represented the Glasgow FA in their annual challenge match against Sheffield.

See also
List of Scotland national football team captains
List of Scottish football families

References

External links

1943 deaths
Date of death missing
Scottish footballers
Scottish Football League players
Footballers from West Dunbartonshire
1875 births
Date of birth missing
Scotland international footballers
Renton F.C. players
Queen's Park F.C. players
Hibernian F.C. players
St Mirren F.C. players
Association football fullbacks
People from Cardross, Argyll and Bute